An election to the Llandeilo Rural District Council was held in April 1925. It was preceded by the 1922 election and followed by the 1928 election. The successful candidates were also elected to the Llandeilo Board of Guardians.

Overview of the result

As in the past many candidates stood without party affiliations although an increased number of Labour candidates contested the industrial wards but the party lost ground following the party's defeat at a national level at the 1924 General Election. As in previous elections a number of the members representing rural wards were returned unopposed.

Ward results

Betws (three seats)

Blaenau (three seats)

Brechfa (one seat)

Glynamman (one seat)

Llandebie (three seats)

Llandeilo Fawr North Ward (three seats)

Llandeilo Fawr South Ward (two seats)

Llandyfeisant (one seat)

Llanegwad (three seats)

Llanfihangel Aberbythych (two seats)

Llanfihangel Cilfragen (one seat)

Llanfynydd (two seats)

Llangathen (two seats)

Llansawel (two seats)
This was the only contest in a rural ward at the election.

Quarter Bach No.1 (one seat)

Quarter Bach No.2 (one seat)

Talley (two seats)

Llandeilo Board of Guardians

All members of the District Council also served as members of Llandeilo Board of Guardians. A further three Guardians were elected to represent the Llandeilo Urban District.

Elected candidates at both Ammanford and Cwmamman stood specifically as Liberals, in contrast to the non-political nature of previous Guardians elections.

Ammanford (three seats)
The three sitting members, including Henry Herbert, a Guardian for nearly forty years, were re-elected.

Cwmamman (three seats)

Llandeilo (three seats)

References

Llandeilo
Council elections in Wales
Carmarthenshire
1925 Welsh local elections